The economy of Kosovo is a transition economy. Kosovo was the poorest province of the former Yugoslavia with a modern economy established only after a series of federal development subsidies in the 1960s and the 1970s.

During the 1990s, the abolition of the province's autonomous institutions was followed by poor economic policies, international sanctions, little access to external trade and finance, and ethnic conflict. These factors severely damaged the already-weak economy. Since the declaration of independence in 2008, Kosovo's economy has grown each year, with relatively low effects from the global financial crisis. There are many weaknesses for its potential in the future, many of them related to its internationally disputed status. But here are also potential strengths, including its very low level of government debt (as most of historical debts are still paid by Serbia), future liabilities, and the strength of its banking system (despite remaining obstacles to using this for productive loans).

Developments from 1999
After strong increases in 2000 and 2001, as a result of postwar reconstruction and foreign assistance, growth in gross domestic product (GDP) was negative in 2002. In the period from 2003 to 2011 it resumed its upward trajectory, despite declining foreign assistance, averaging over 5 percent a year. It is noteworthy that growth continued during the financial crisis of 2009, and returned to 5 percent in 2011. Inflation was low, while the budget posted a deficit for the first time in 2004.

Kosovo has a negative balance of trade; in 2004, the deficit of the balance of goods and services was close to 70 percent of GDP, and was 39 percent of GDP in 2011. Remittances from the Kosovo diaspora accounted for an estimated 14 percent of GDP, little changed over the previous decade.

Most economic development since 1999 has taken place in the trade, retail and construction sectors. The private sector which has emerged since 1999 is mainly small-scale. The industrial sector remains weak. The economy, and its sources of growth, are therefore geared far more to demand than production, as shown by the current account, which was in 2011 in deficit by about 20% of GDP. Consequently, Kosovo is highly dependent on remittances from the diaspora (the majority of these from Germany and Switzerland), foreign direct investment (of which a high proportion also comes from the diaspora, and other capital inflows). Government revenue is also dependent on demand rather than production; only 14% of revenue comes from direct taxes and the rest mainly from customs duties and taxes on consumption.

However, Kosovo has very low levels of general government debt (only 5.8% of GDP) and government liquid assets resulting from past fiscal surpluses (deposited in the Central Bank and invested abroad). Under applicable Kosovo law, there are also substantial assets from privatisation of socially-owned enterprises, also invested abroad by the Central Bank, which should mostly accrue to the Government when liquidation processes have been completed. The net foreign assets of the financial corporations and the Pension Fund amount to well over 50% of GDP.

Moreover, the banking system in Kosovo seems very sound. For the banking system as a whole, the Tier One Capital Ratio as of January 2012 was 17.5%, double the ratio required in the EU; the proportion of non-performing loans was 5.9%, well below the regional average; and the credit to deposit ratio was only just above 80%. The assets of the banking system have increased from 5% of GDP in 2000 to 60% of GDP as of January 2012. Since the housing stock in Kosovo is generally good by South-East European standards, this suggests that (if the legal system's ability to enforce claims on collateral and resolve property issues is trusted), credit to Kosovars could be safely expanded.

The United Nations Interim Administration Mission in Kosovo introduced an external trade office and customs administration on September 3, 1999, when it established border controls in Kosovo. All goods imported to Kosovo face a flat 10% duty. These taxes are collected at all Tax Collection Points at Kosovo's borders, including that between Kosovo and Serbia's uncontested territory. The U.N. Interim Administration and Kosovo institutions have signed free-trade agreements with Croatia, Bosnia and Herzegovina, Albania, North Macedonia.

The euro is the official currency of Kosovo.  Kosovo adopted the German mark in 1999 to replace the Yugoslav dinar, and later replaced it with the euro, although the Yugoslav (and later Serbian) dinar is still used in some Serb-majority areas (mostly in the north). This means that Kosovo has no levers of monetary policy over its economy, and must rely on a conservative fiscal policy to provide the means to respond to external shocks.

Officially registered unemployment stood at 30.9% of the labour force in September 2013, although 63.1% of the population are not economically active. The IMF have pointed out that informal employment is widespread, and the ratio of wages to per capita GDP is the second highest in South-East Europe; the true rate may therefore be lower.  Unemployment among the Roma minority may be as high as 90%. The mean wage in 2009 was $2.98 per hour.

The dispute over Kosovo's international status, and the interpretation which some non-recognising states place on symbols which may or may not imply sovereignty, continues to impose economic costs on Kosovo. Examples include flight diversions because of a Serbian ban on flights to Kosovo over its territory; loss of revenues because of a lack of a regional dialling code (end-user fees on fixed lines accrue to Serbian Telecoms, while Kosovo has to pay Monaco and Slovenia for use of their regional codes for mobile phone connections); no IBAN code for bank transfers; and no regional Kosovo code for the internet. A major deterrent to foreign manufacturing investment in Kosovo was removed in 2011 when the European Council accepted a Convention allowing Kosovo to be accepted as part of its rules for diagonal cumulative origination, allowing the label of Kosovo origination to goods which have been processed there but originated in a country elsewhere in the convention.

Since 2002 the European Commission has compiled a yearly progress report on Kosovo, evaluating its political and economic situation. For 2008 the European Commission reported a GDP growth of 5.4% – essentially due to public investment (194% growth, compared to a 10.2% decline in private investment) – but the report also noted that the unsatisfactory state of the statistical system does not allow for a comprehensive assessment of the situation.

Kosovo became a member of the World Bank and the International Monetary Fund on 29 June 2009.

Foreign direct investment

Leading Countries in Foreign Direct Investment (2007 to 2011) 
Germany: €292 million;	United Kingdom: €251 million; Slovenia: €195 million; Austria: €133 million: Switzerland: €115 million; the Netherlands: €109 million, Albania: €70 million, Turkey: €64 million, the United States: €31 million, and France: €5 million.

Foreign direct investment in Kosovo is still a relatively small contribution to the Kosovo economy, compared with other transition economies. Much of the reason is, apart from a late start in 2000–2001, because of legal and political uncertainties, and an incomplete, contested, and very slow system of privatisation before the declaration of independence in 2008. Thus Kosovo still retains a state-owned telecommunications company, a state-owned electricity monopoly (with the largest lignite reserves in Europe), and a ski-resort in Brezovica (a Serb-majority area) which was the Winter Olympics reserve site during the Sarajevo Winter Olympics. All of these are now under the process of privatisation. Other infrastructure companies (water, railways) may also be privatised.

While there remain significant disincentives to investment in Kosovo (a small domestic market, residual political uncertainty, perceptions of corruption, and a slow and uncertain judicial system), there are also incentives. These include a much younger workforce than elsewhere in south-eastern Europe, which has been more exposed to Western European culture and has higher linguistic standards (see next paragraph); a low corporate tax-rate; access to the European Union and Central European Free Trade Agreement markets; and a government with low debt and low contingent liabilities in terms of pension and other social welfare transfers. Information and communications technology in Kosovo has also developed very rapidly and broadband internet penetration is comparable to the European Union average.

Labor law 

Maternal and Paternal Leave

A lack of female employment opportunities in Kosovo perpetuates a traditional society in which many women remain in the home. Provisions for maternity leave were approved by the Assembly of Kosovo in 2011, where maximum time allotted for maternity leave was set at one year. Female employees are compensated 70% of wages throughout the first six months of maternity leave by the firms at which they are employed. The following three months are covered by the government at 50% of the nation's average wage of 450 Euros per month. The optional final three months of the twelve-month leave are unpaid. Firms are not permitted to terminate the employment of employees taking maternity leave. Upon the birth or adoption of a child, a father receives three days of paid leave. After informing an employer ten days in advance of his intent to do so, a father may take two weeks of unpaid leave upon the adoption or birth of a child, until the child reaches the age of three. In the event that a woman dies while on a maternity leave, the father of her child is eligible to receive the benefits of maternity leave.

Representatives of women's groups in Kosovo find maternity leave provisions to be discriminatory as they de-incentivize employers from hiring qualified female employees on account of the costs associated with maternity leave. Women's organizations in Kosovo attribute higher rates of female unemployment compared to male unemployment  to employers’ avoidance of the financial obligations incurred by maternity leave. Surveys conducted amongst women seeking employment in Kosovo have found that certain employers require potential female employees to take pregnancy tests upon receiving their applications for employment. The Constitution of the Republic of Kosovo and the Law on Protection from Discrimination protect employees against all forms of discrimination, including family status, pregnancy and maternity leave. Employee discrimination claims may be supported in legal procedures by associations or legal entities according to the Law on Protection from Discrimination.

If standard prenatal checkups must occur during working hours, pregnant employees have the right to be absent from work without any loss of pay. Section four of the Safety, Health, and the Working Environment Act stipulates that pregnant employees are not permitted to work more than 40 hours in one week, overnight shifts or perform strenuous physical tasks. Upon returning to work from maternity leave, female Kosovar employees are entitled to two hours of paid leave throughout the work day in which they may breastfeed, in accordance with  The Law on Protection of Breastfeeding. Free childcare services are offered in a growing number of municipalities to ease the transition from maternity leave to the workplace and enable new mothers to retain employment

Employment Termination

Labor contracts  are signed by employers and employees upon the hiring of new employees. The contract details the role that each party is to play within the employment relationship. A job's description, level of compensation, scheduled hours, duration, number of vacation days provided, termination rules, schedule and location are stipulated within the contract. Contracts may be signed for a fixed or indefinite amount of time. Termination of labor contracts may occur upon contract expiration, the death of an employee, or an employee's eligibility for pension collection. If the performance of an employee is unsatisfactory, the employer may issue a warning that failure to improve performance will result in the termination of employment. Should the employee fail to improve after receiving a warning, termination of employment will occur before the date originally stipulated within the contract signed by both parties. Termination of an employment contract may also occur within the stipulated period for termination if the employing firm is no longer able to function on account of technical, financial or management failure.

Transportation

Road Network 
The road network consists of 2,378.7 km of roads, of which 137.2 km are motorways, 755.2 km national roads and 1,486.3 km are regional roads.: Kosovo is connected to Albania through the R7 motorway, which connects Prishtina to Vërmica and then continues to Durrës as the A1 motorway. Kosovo is additionally connected to North Macedonia through the R 6 motorway, which connects Prishtina with Elez Han and was opened in 2019.

Railways 
Kosovo's railroads cover a length of 333 km. There are only two active railway lines within Kosovo, one that connects Prishtina to Peja and another that connects Prishtina to Skopje, North Macedonia. Kosovo is additionally connected to Serbia, but the railways are currently inoperative since Kosovo's declaration of independence. There are currently plans to build a railway to connect Prishtina to Durrës in Albania.

Air Transportation 
Pristina International Airport Adem Jashari is, with over two million passengers per year, one of the most frequented airports of the region. There are plans to functionalize the Gjakova Airport in the south-western part of Kosovo, which used to be a military airport and is currently out of use. After the Kosovo War, Kosovo's airspace was controlled by NATO. Today, Kosovo controls its lower airspace (up to 10,000 feet), but the upper airspace is controlled by HungaroControl since 2014. There are currently two active air corridors in Kosovo's lower air space, with North Macedonia and Albania, but the corridors with Montenegro and Serbia remain closed.

Energy

Kosovo Energy Corporation is currently the sole power corporation in the Republic of Kosovo. It is vertically integrated and was legally incorporated at the end of 2005. It relies on extensive lignite deposits - 14.7 billion tonnes, the fifth largest in the world, with a relatively high calorific value for lignite. In 2021 demand was met by coal-power plants (6,585 GWh), imports (3,336 GWh) and hydro and solar energy (305 GWh).

In Yugoslav times, Kosovo was a net exporter of electricity. But its current generating capacity has been affected by many factors. The generation units were designed for a life of 30 years but have all operated for longer than 28 years, and in some cases for 50 years. They were part of a much wider integrated energy system in which they could be shut down for maintenance without local economic consequences. Maintenance was reduced in the period from 1989 to 1999; and expert (Albanian) workers were sacked in 1990 and expert (Serb) workers left in 1999.
Major investments are being made in the sector of renewable sources of energy. There are currently two completed wind farms (Bajgora Wind Park and Kitka Wind Farm) with a combined installed capacity of 137.4 MW. Also, other projects for wind farms and solar parks are waiting for approval.

Distribution has also suffered. The Northern (Serb-majority) municipalities have received free electricity without any ability by Kosovo Energy Corporation to receive payment. There are plans to stop subsidising free power supplies for consumers in four Serb-majority municipalities, which had been costing millions of euros a year.

Currently, there are good transmission lines between Kosovo's neighboring countries and they include a 400kV transmission line with Albania, North Macedonia, Montenegro and Serbia. There are also 220kV transmission lines between Kosovo and Albania and between Kosovo and Serbia.

Natural resources

Kosovo is rich in natural resources, and has been an important mining centre for much of its history. In Kosovo there is substantially high reserves of lead, zinc, silver, nickel, cobalt, copper, iron and bauxite.  There is also believed to be around 14 billion tonnes of lignite. Canadian company Avrupa Minerals Ltd has achieved the rights to a three-year mining programme, which is expected to start in summer 2011. In 2005 the Directorate for Mines and Minerals and the World Bank estimated that Kosovo had €13.5 Billion worth of minerals. However, Kosovo has a high density of population and buildings by South-Eastern European standards, and full exploitation of these resources at an acceptable environmental cost may not be easy.

Mineral deposits
Lignite
Lignite is of outstanding importance in Kosovo. It contributes 97% of the total electricity generation, with just 3% being based on hydropower. At 14,700 megatons, Kosovo possesses the world's fifth-largest proven reserves of lignite. The lignite is distributed across the Kosovo, Dukagjin and Drenica Basins, although mining has so far been restricted to the Kosovo Basin. The first systematic records of lignite exploitation date from 1922, when small-scale, shallow underground room-and-pillar mining commenced in the Kosovo Basin. Large-scale winning of lignite began with the first production from the Miraš (1958) and Bardh (1969) open-pit mines, using bucketwheel excavators.
Cumulative exploitation from the commencement of mining in 1922 up to the end of 2004 has amounted to 265 megatons. Geologically, Kosovo's lignite mines exploit one of the most favorable lignite deposits in Europe. The average stripping ratio is 1.7m3 of waste to one tonne of coal and the total estimated economically exploitable resource represents one of the richest in Europe, which would allow ambitious power generation and expansion schemes in forthcoming decades.

The lignite is of high quality for the generation of electricity and compares well with the lignite resources of neighbouring countries on a range of parameters. Kosovo's lignite varies in net calorific value from 6.28 to 9.21 MJ/kg, averaging 7.8 MJ/kg. The deposits (Pliocene in age) can be up to 100 m thick, but average 40 m, and possess an average strip ratio of 1.7:1. This combination has meant that the cost of lignite-fuelled electricity in Kosovo is the lowest in the region. Kosovo's cost of €0.62/GJ compares favourably with €0.88/GJ in Bulgaria and €1.34/GJ in Serbia and Montenegro.

Further development of lignite mining in the medium term will continue with the exploitation of the Sibovc mining field in the northern part of the Kosovo Basin, and provides a great opportunity for private investors.

Lead zinc-silver
In what today is Kosovo base-metal mining has been a mainstay of the economy, since pre-Roman times. Illyrians, Romans, Byzantines, Saxons, Turks, French and Britons have all conducted extensive mining in the region. These activities have been based on a series of nine mines, of which five comprise today's Trepca Complex. Modern mining began in the 1930s, when the British company Selection Trust Ltd revamped the Trepca Complex, including the development of a battery factory that utilised the lead. Active mining of the five mines ceased during the NATO bombing campaign of 1998. The locations of the Trepca mines define the Trepca Mineral Belt. There are three NNW-SSE trending zones of mineralisation within this belt that hosts the ore deposits.

Zone I includes the Novo Brdo mine and follows the boundary between the Vardar Zone and the Kosovo sector of the Serbo-Macedonian Massif, which is characterised by extensive Neogene calc-alkaline volcanics and intrusives. Zone II includes the Belo Brdo, Stan Terg and Hajvalia mines. This zone follows the major fault that marks the eastern margin of the Miocene Pristina basin, and its extension to the NNW and the intrusive and volcanic complexes in northern Kosovo. Zone III includes the Crnac mine, and hosts a number of lead-zinc occurrences along the western border of the Vardar Zone, where it is in contact with the Dinaride Drina-Ivanjica (Drenica) structural block.

Current estimates for combined mineable reserves for the five mines have been undertaken, but all of the deposits are open at depth and their strike lengths are uncertain, owing to a lack of systematic exploration and definition drilling. During the lead-zinc-silver exploitation at Farbani Potok (Artana-Novo Brdo), about 3 megatons of high-grade halloysite was discovered. This is only one of five known exploitable deposits of this very high-value (US$140–450/t) clay, the other four being in New Zealand, Turkey, China and Utah, US. Current world production is estimated at 150,000 tons per year.

Nickel

Chromium
A chain of Alpine-type chromite pods in southwestern Kosovo are part of a series of linear deposits that continue into Albania. These pods are small but of high grade and in Albania are known to possess enhanced levels of platinum group metals (PGM).

From the end of World War Two until 1956, the ores were worked, primarily from the Gjakova mine by Deva holding company, and direct-shipping ore was sent to Albania for treatment. When the high-grade ore was depleted, Kosovo began importing 30,000- 50,000 t/y of chromite ore from Albania. This ceased when the plant was closed in 1991. No meaningful exploration for chrome has been undertaken for several decades.

Bauxite and limestone
Kosovo's bauxite deposits are hosted in karst limestone and have been exploited in a series of pits that comprise the Grebnik mine. The host limestone was worked as a construction material and a sizeable stockpile of broken limestone remains on site. Mining began in 1966 and ceased in 1990, owing to the deteriorating political climate in Kosovo. Total production was 2.85 Mt. The traditional markets for bauxite from Grebnik were Romania, Germany and Russia. The mine had a fines mixing and bagging facility to produce wall plaster; production was 5,000 t/y, for the domestic market, and Montenegro and Macedonia.

Magnesite
Kosovo possesses two magnesite (MgCO3) mines at Golesh and Strezovc. Both were originally worked as quarries and both moved to underground operations prior to their closure in 1999. Before 1990, the Golesh operation produced 110,000 t of magnesite, 22,000 t of sintered magnesia and 10,000 t of caustic calcined magnesia per annum. Golesh mine is accessed via a shaft, whereas Strezovc is accessed via a horizontal adit in the hillside. Both mines have recently been put up for privatisation. For further information on the privatisation process, visit: www.pak-ks.org/

Quarried materials
Kosovo is rich in high quality construction minerals, such as andesite, basalt, diabas, gabbro, granite, limestone and marble.

Wines
Wine has been historically produced in Kosovo. During the Yugoslav era, province of Kosovo was one of the biggest producers of wine in the federation. In 1989, Kosovo exported 40 million liters of wine to Germany alone. The political instability after the suppression of Kosovo's autonomy and the subsequent war led to a collapse of the wine industry and destruction of much of the winemaking infrastructure in the 1990s. Wine production has been recovering since. The main heartland of Kosovo's wine industry is in Rahovec where millions of litres of wine is produced. The main wines produced in Kosovo include pinot noir, merlot and chardonnay. Kosovo has recently been exporting wines to Germany and the United States.

Trade
Kosovo is a small open economy and mainly imports more goods and services than it exports. It is committed to trade liberalization. Participation in regional and wider trade facilitating mechanisms has been one of the main policy objectives of Kosovo institutions. Enhancing trade in Kosovo through liberalized trade requires three aspects to be in place, import rationalization and replacement, trade facilitation and export promotion. This is the United Nations Conference on Trade and Development integrated export strategy which gives equal importance to competitiveness in the domestic market and competitiveness in the foreign market.

Kosovo's largest export market is Italy (averaging an amount of €84 million), followed by Albania (€34 million), the Republic of Macedonia (€31 million) and Germany (€24 million). Imports are mostly from European Union and Central European Free Trade Agreement countries. The Republic of Macedonia is the biggest exporter in Kosovo (with €366 million) followed by Germany (€293 million), Serbia (€255 million) and Turkey (€184 million). Exports until December 2011 reached €319 million, dominated by significantly larger imports of €2.49 billion. This was a 7.8% increase for exports and 15.5% for imports compared to the same period in 2010.

The foreign trade shows a net deficit of €2,17 billion for December 2011, which is increased for 302 million compared to the same period 2010. One of the worst problem faced by Kosovo is the negative trade balance, this is made worse by the high level of informal economic activity and an uncontrolled black market, led by illegal groups in northern Kosovo. Exports are dominated mainly by raw materials. Kosovo's liberal trade regime is characterized by simplicity and neutrality, key features considered to be important for stimulating private sector led growth as well as creating the conditions for healthy exports. But as trade liberalization has not been accompanied by an improvement in the competitiveness of the emerging domestic production sectors, Kosovo is facing a huge trade deficit.

In June 2009, Kosovo joined the World Bank and International Monetary Fund, and Kosovo began servicing its share of the former Yugoslavia's debt. In order to help integrate Kosovo into regional economic structures, United Nations Interim Administration Mission in Kosovo signed (on behalf of Kosovo) its accession to the Central European Free Trade Agreement in 2006. Serbia and Bosnia and Herzegovina previously had refused to recognize Kosovo's customs stamp or extend reduced tariff privileges for Kosovo products under the Central European Free Trade Agreement, but both countries resumed trade with Kosovo in 2011.

List of companies

Banks

Banks in Kosovo

Commercial banks operating in Kosovo marked their highest profit since their establishment. During 2011, the eight commercial banks operating in the country's financial markets have recorded together a profit of over 37 million Euros.

"ProCredit Bank" and "Raiffeisen Bank" marked the greater percentage from the total profit. The first recorded a profit of 16.8 million Euros, while the "Raiffeisen" has recorded a profit of over 12 million Euros. Compared with 2010, the commercial banks had around 5 million Euros more profit in 2011. The total net value of loans granted by commercial banks listed on 31 December 2011 amounted to 1.562 billion Euros. Meanwhile, in 2010, the net value of loans granted by commercial banks was 1.335 billion Euros. During 2011, lending increased by 227 million Euros. The value of deposits during 2011 has increased by 100 million Euros, reaching a total of 2.097 billion Euros. The United States and Kosovo in September 2012, signed a groundbreaking agricultural development credit scheme worth over €20 million. The program is to provide loan guarantees to six Kosovo banks to issue loans to farmers and agricultural businesses, increasing lending to a sector that is constrained by lack of access to credit.

Commercial banks of Kosovo
Banka Ekonomike
BKT Kosovë
BPB Banka për Biznes
LESNA nbfi
NLB Bank
ProCredit Bank Kosova
Raiffeisen Bank Kosovo J.S.C.
TEB Kosovo
IŞBANK

Telecommunications
Kosovo has two Global System for Mobile Communications 900 MHz networks, Vala and IPKO. The prefix of those operators is +383. Telenor and Telekom Srbija (Serbian operators) used to have coverage in Pristina and some other little areas of Kosovo, but their towers have been dismantled in the independent territory, so that GSM coverage is now offered only by the two local operators. In 2009 the first mobile virtual network operator appeared in Kosovo. It's called D3 and uses IPKO's Slovenian network. The secondo MVNO, Z Mobile, uses Vala's network and Monaco prefix.

There are two virtual operators :
D3 Mobile  - 043 prefix
Z Mobile  - 045 prefix

GSM-services in Kosovo are provided by Vala, a subsidiary of PTK, and IPKO, a company owned by Slovenian Telecom, which has acquired the second mobile operator license in Kosovo and has started operations in late 2007. Vala has over 850.000 subscribers, mostly using the pre-paid system, whereas IPKO has gained over 300,000 subscribers within just a few months.

Market share

Based on the report of the TRA, VALA remains the leader in mobile telephony market in Kosovo, taking over 67% of the total, if included Z-mobile virtual operator, which uses the infrastructure VALA network.

Internet in Kosovo

KV - 2,350,000 population (2015) - territorial area: 10,908 km2

Capital city: Pristina - population 500,000 (est.)

1,693,942  Internet users as of March 2021, 93.6% penetration, per GfK.

Facebook users, 1.000.000 (est.)
IPKO
Post and Telecom of Kosovo (PTK)
Kujtesa

Industry

See also
Central Bank of Kosovo
History of Kosovo
List of banks in Kosovo

Notes

References

 
Kosovo